Up Against It is a 1912 American romantic comedy short film directed by Otis Turner and starring King Baggot. It was produced by the Independent Moving Pictures (IMP) Company of New York.

As of 2012, a print of this film survives, with Dutch intertitles, in the holdings of the EYE Film Institute Netherlands in Amsterdam.

References

External links
 

1912 films
1912 comedy films
American silent short films
American black-and-white films
1912 short films
American comedy short films
Films directed by Otis Turner
1910s American films
Silent American comedy films